Just Dance: Disney Party is a game in the Just Dance series developed by Japanese studio Land Ho! in association with Disney Interactive Studios and published by Ubisoft for the Wii and Kinect for Xbox 360 as a spin-off title of the Just Dance Kids series. The game was released worldwide in October 2012. The game is similar to Just Dance Kids 2 with the live action dancers, the game modes (Team High Scores, Freeze & Shake, Balloon Pop), and the animated score icons, except it includes a duet mode, where in the first two Just Dance Kids games, all of the songs had only the dancer in the middle of the screen to follow. In addition, all the songs are the original versions, not covers. A sequel, Just Dance: Disney Party 2, was released on October 20, 2015.

Gameplay
The gameplay is identical to the other games in Ubisoft's franchise, Just Dance. Players are required to perform specific dance moves in time with the music, following a routine indicated on-screen and performed by live dancers. If the player performs well, by dancing accurately and in-time, their score will build and a rating out of 4 stars is obtained upon completion of the track.

Track list
The track list consists of a total of 25 songs.

References

2012 video games
Dance video games
Music video games
Fitness games
Ubisoft franchises
Ubisoft games
Just Dance (video game series)
Xbox 360 games
Kinect games
Wii games
Disney video games
The Muppets video games
Multiplayer and single-player video games
Video games developed in Japan